Eye doctor is an Eye care professional, and may refer to the following medical specialists:
Ophthalmologist
Ophthalmic medical practitioner
Optometrist